The First United Front (alternatively ), also known as the KMT–CCP Alliance, of the Kuomintang (KMT) and the Chinese Communist Party (CCP), was formed in 1924 as an alliance to end warlordism in China. Together they formed the National Revolutionary Army and set out in 1926 on the Northern Expedition. The CCP joined the KMT as individuals, making use of KMT's superiority in numbers to help spread communism. The KMT, on the other hand, wanted to control the communists from within. Both parties had their own aims and the Front was unsustainable. In 1927, KMT leader Chiang Kai-shek purged the Communists from the Front while the Northern Expedition was still half-complete. This initiated a civil war between the two parties that lasted until the Second United Front was formed in 1936 to prepare for the coming Second Sino-Japanese War.

The resurrection of Kuomintang 
During the time of warlords, Sun Yat-sen kept the idea of a united Chinese republic alive. His goal was to establish a rival government in Guangzhou, southern China, and go from there to fight against the warlords in the North and their Beiyang government. Upon his return from exile in 1917, Sun revived his banned nationalist party, the Kuomintang, but this time he gave it the new name, the Kuomintang of China. His plan was that after defeating the warlords the party would guide China until the country would be ready to move to democracy.

The rival government led by Sun, however, was at a disadvantage against the warlords from a military point of view. Despite his requests for aid from the West, badly needed financial and arms support never arrived in the country. In the 1920s the Kuomintang eventually received help from the Russian Bolsheviks. Material aid from Russia was good enough for Sun, who had previously shown flexibility when the question was about the promotion of the republic. He had neither sympathy towards Marxism nor did he see communism as a solution to China's problems. In Sun's view, China was not of the rich and the poor; rather, it was the country of the poor and the poorer. The guidelines of the Kuomintang were based on Sun's "Three Principles of the People": nationalism, democracy and the people's livelihood (socialism).

The Kuomintang gradually became a powerful and disciplined party under Russian guidance. The decisive factor was the Bolshevik's assistance to the Kuomintang in the formation of its own army, the National Revolutionary Army. In order to train the army the Whampoa Military Academy was established near Guangzhou. As its director, Sun appointed his loyal supporter Chiang Kai-shek. Financially the Whampoa Military Academy operated with the support of the Soviet Union. The quality of education was guaranteed by regularly visiting Russian officers. Many of the leaders of both the Kuomintang and the CCP graduated from the academy—the chief commander of the People's Liberation Army, Lin Biao, graduated from Whampoa, as did Zhou Enlai, who later became premier of Communist China.

Together against the warlords and imperialists 
The Soviet Union had its own interests in supporting the Kuomintang. The Bolsheviks, in exchange for their help, demanded that the Kuomintang form an alliance with the Chinese communists. China's newly founded Communist Party had only a few hundred members at the beginning of the 1920s, whereas the Kuomintang had over 50,000. The idea was that the communists would gain broader support by joining the common front with the nationalists, after which they would eventually take over from the Kuomintang. At the request of the Russians, the Chinese communists—among them Mao Zedong—became members of the Kuomintang, and thus the first coalition of the two parties was born.

With the help of the Soviet Union, the Kuomintang did succeed in gaining more support, and with renewed vehemence, it continued to vigorously pursue its goal—the unification of the republic. Securing its grip on southern China, the Kuomintang was ready to unite the country by launching a military campaign against the North. The coalition with the communists, however, was a forced union, held together only by their common enemies: the warlords and imperialism. After the death of Sun Yat-Sen in 1925 cooperation began to weaken.

Fall 
The First United Front was formed so the KMT and the CCP could join to strengthen China. The initial aim was to help defeat the warlord threat (through the Northern Expedition of 1926–28), but both parties actually had ulterior motives with this alliance. The CCP formed it mainly so it could spread communism within the KMT and its members, while Chiang's aim was to control the Communist Party from the inside. Having said that, he was also the main reason the relationship fell apart, due to his desire to control the Communist Party, ultimately leading to the disintegration of the First United Front. After purging the Communists and Soviet advisors from Whampoa and his Nationalist army during the 1926 "Canton Coup", Chiang went on to kill a large number of Communist forces in mid-1927, an event known as the Shanghai massacre. The massacre occurred about halfway through the Northern Expedition, ultimately ruining the First United Front and resulting in the Chinese Civil War. The Civil War was later postponed when the two sides formed the Second United Front to combat the Japanese in the Second Sino-Japanese War.

See also 
United Front (China)
United Front in Taiwan
United front
United Front Work Department

1923 establishments in China
Chinese Civil War
Defunct left-wing political party alliances
Military history of the Republic of China (1912–1949)
National Revolutionary Army
Political party alliances in China
United front (China)